The Unity Party (TBP, until 1973 Birlik Partisi - BP) was a former Alevi  political party that existed from 1966 until its closure in 1981 after the military coup of 1980. It had its roots among the Alevi population in modern-day Turkey. Huseyin Balan was elected party president in 1966, and was succeeded in 1969 by Mustafa Timisi. Some of the main party leaders were members of an influent Alevi family of the Ulusoy.

It gained seats in the Turkish Parliament between 1966 and 1977. In the general elections of 1969, the party entered parliament with eight deputies of which five also supported the Government of Süleyman Demirel. In the general elections of 1973 the party only stemmed 1.1% of the voter share, gaining a single deputy in parliament, which was Mustafa Timisi. The party advocated for the recognition of the Alevis through the Directorate of Religious Affairs and demanded more religious freedom. It also worked closely together with Alevi organizations. It was more supportive towards Kemalism and did not gain so much support supposedly of the Kurdish Alevi. Its logo depicted a lion encircled by 12 stars representing Ali and the 12 twelve imams. Its successor was the Peace Party (Barış Partisi, BP) existed between 1996 and 1999 - a splinter party from the Republican People's Party (CHP).

References

History of the Alevis
Political parties of minorities
Left-wing parties
Anti-clerical parties
Political parties established in 1966
1966 establishments in Turkey
Defunct political parties in Turkey
Political parties disestablished in 1981
1981 disestablishments in Turkey